The John E. Carlson Coliseum is a 4,200-seat multi-purpose arena in Fargo, North Dakota. It is the home of the North Dakota State University ice hockey club team of the American Collegiate Hockey Association. 

It was the former home to the Fargo-Moorhead Jets, the Fargo North Spartans, and the Fargo South Bruins ice hockey teams.

It opened in 1968, and was renovated during 2017. It  now has a regulation-size rink, ice generation equipment, team locker and training room, referees room, and full Wi-Fi access.

References

External links
John E. Carlson Coliseum website

Indoor arenas in North Dakota
Indoor ice hockey venues in the United States
Sports venues in North Dakota
Buildings and structures in Fargo, North Dakota
Sports venues completed in 1968
1968 establishments in North Dakota
College ice hockey venues in the United States